Peñarol is a sports club based in Montevideo, Uruguay.

Peñarol or Penarol may also refer to:
Club Atlético Peñarol (basketball), a senior men's basketball section of Peñarol
Club Atlético Argentino Peñarol, a football club based in Córdoba, Argentina 
Peñarol de Mar del Plata, an Argentine basketball team
Peñarol, Montevideo, a barrio of Montevideo, Uruguay
Penarol Atlético Clube, a football club based in Itacoatiara, Amazonas, Brazil
Halcones FC or Peñarol La Mesilla, a football club based in Huehuetenango, Guatemala